Hatzerim (lit. Farmyards) is a kibbutz located 8 kilometers west of Beersheba in the Negev desert in Israel. It is named after the Bible (Deuteronomy 2:23), mentioning a site nearby: "the Avvites who lived in farmyards as far as Gaza". It belongs to the Bnei Shimon Regional Council.

History
The community was established in October 1946 by a young group of scouts who were then later joined by Polish-Jewish refugees from the Soviet Union; they reached Israel via Iran with the Polish Army, referred to as "The Children of Tehran" ("Dzieci Andersa" in Polish). They then learned agriculture and military training becoming part of the Haganah ground forces. 

In the 1960s, the Hatzerim Airbase was built nearby. Hatzerim is now a well developed kibbutz (one of Israel's richest) due to the profits from Netafim. The kibbutz has amenities such as a library, swimming pool, dentist and a zoo.

Netafim

Hatzerim was one of the first kibbutzim (pl.) to break the mould from traditional agriculture and start a business. Netafim is the kibbutz business that started in 1965, that designs, manufactures and distributes irrigation systems. The business is also run with two other kibbutzim, Magal and Yiftach. There are also factories around the world, California, USA, South Africa, Western Australia and more.  Netafim soon became a world leader in their field as a multinational corporation that grosses over $300 million a year.
Hatzerim also produces jojoba oil. There are fields all around the kibbutz.

References

Further reading 
 Gavron, Daniel.  The Kibbutz: Awakening from Utopia.  Lanham, MD: Rowman & Littlefield, 2000.

External links
Kibbutz website 
Netafim Website 
Hatzerim Dance Studio and Dance Company 

Kibbutzim
Kibbutz Movement
Populated places established in 1946
1946 establishments in Mandatory Palestine